The Psychiatric Quarterly is a peer-reviewed medical journal that was established in 1915 as The State Hospital Quarterly ( and ). It obtained its current name in 1927. The publication's founding editor-in-chief was Horatio Pollock.

Abstracting and indexing 
The journal is abstracted and indexed in the Science Citation Index, PubMed, and EMBASE, among others. According to the Journal Citation Reports, the journal has a 2010 impact factor of 1.327, ranking it 62nd out of 110 journals in the category "Psychiatry".

In popular culture 
In the 2002 episode "Surprise!" of the program Greg the Bunny, it is revealed that character Dottie Sunshine is a reader of Psychiatric Quarterly.

References

External links 
 
 Online archive of The State Hospital Quarterly at the HathiTrust Digital Library

Psychiatry journals
Quarterly journals
Publications established in 1927
Springer Science+Business Media academic journals
English-language journals